The mountain tube-nosed fruit bat (Nyctimene certans) is a species of megabat in the family Pteropodidae. It is endemic to New Guinea island and to New Britain Island.

References

Nyctimene (genus)
Bats of Oceania
Bats of Indonesia
Mammals of Papua New Guinea
Mammals of Western New Guinea
Fauna of New Britain
Near threatened animals
Near threatened biota of Asia
Near threatened biota of Oceania
Mammals described in 1912
Taxa named by Knud Andersen
Taxonomy articles created by Polbot
Bats of New Guinea